Falk Richter (born 23 October 1969) is a German author, theater director, and playwright.

Early life and education
Falk Richter was born on 23 October 1969 in Hamburg. His father was a merchant. He studied linguistics, philosophy and theatre directing at the University of Hamburg, graduating with a production of Silikon at the Kampnagel theatre in 1996.

Career
Falk Richter is the author of theater and audio plays, translator and theatre director who has worked for numerous theatres, including Deutsche Schauspielhaus, National Theatre Oslo, the Hamburg State Opera, the Wiener Staatsoper, and the Bayerische Staatsoper. He was resident director at Schauspielhaus Zürich from 2000 to 2004, at the Berliner Schaubühne from 2006 to 2010 and at the Düsseldorfer Schauspielhaus from 2011 to 2012. Since 2015, he has been Artiste associé at the Théâtre national de Strasbourg and since 2017 he has been working as resident director at the Deutschen Schauspielhaus in Hamburg.

Richter was elected director of the year by theater critics in a survey of the monthly Theater heute in August 2018. His production of Elfriede Jelinek's play Am Königsweg in Hamburg was voted production of the year 2018. In February 2019, he received a Special Teddy Award at the Berlinale.

Richter was visiting professor for directing at the Hochschule für Schauspielkunst Ernst Busch in Berlin. In 2019, he started to serve a five-year term as professor of Performing Arts at the Danish National School of Performing Arts in Copenhagen. Starting with the 2020/2021 season, Richter will be leading director at the Munich Kammerspiele.

His plays have been translated into more than 25 languages and are produced all over the world.

Plays (selection)
 Alles in einer Nacht, premiered at the Hamburg Kammerspiele 1996, Fischer-Verlag
 Kult – Geschichten für eine virtuelle Generation, (trilogy)/premiered at the Düsseldorf Schauspielhaus 1996: Portrait Image Konzept (Teil 1), Section (Teil 2), KULT (Teil 3), Fischer-Verlag
 Gott ist ein DJ, premiered at the Staatstheater Mainz 1998, Fischer-Verlag
 Nothing Hurts, premiered in Utrecht 1999, Fischer-Verlag
 Peace, premiered at the Schaubühne am Lehniner Platz 2000, Fischer-Verlag
 Electronic City, (Sieben Sekunden), Fischer-Verlag
 Das System, premiered at the Schaubühne am Lehniner Platz 2004, Fischer-Verlag
 Unter Eis, premiered at Schaubühne am Lehniner Platz 2004, Fischer-Verlag
 Hotel Palestine, premiered at the Schaubühne am Lehniner Platz 2004, Fischer-Verlag
 Die Verstörung, premiered at the Schaubühne am Lehniner Platz 2005, Fischer-Verlag
 Verletzte Jugend, premiered at Festival Liége / Theatre National Bruxelles 2009, Fischer-Verlag
 Trust, premiered at the Schaubühne am Lehniner Platz 2009, Fischer-Verlag
 My Secret Garden, premiered at Festival d'Avignon 2010, L'Arche Éditeur, Paris, 2010, Fischer-Verlag

Awards
 2001: Audio play award of the Academy of Arts, Berlin for Nothing hurts – Szenen und Samples, directed by Antje Vowinckel 
 2013: Friedrich Luft Preis for best production in Berlin and Potsdam for the production of For the Disconnected Child at the Schaubühne Berlin
 2018: Director of the year and Production of the year for the production of Am Königsweg by Elfriede Jelinek at the Deutsches Schauspielhaus in Hamburg, elected by the monthly Theater heute 
 2019: Chevalier de l'Ordre des Arts et des Lettres
 2019: Special Teddy Award

References

External links
 http://www.falkrichter.com/EN/home/

1969 births
Living people
German-language writers
German theatre directors